Sander Depovere (born ) is a Belgian male volleyball player. He is part of the Belgium men's national volleyball team. On club level he plays for Topvolley Callant Antwerpen.

References

External links
 profile at FIVB.org

1995 births
Living people
Belgian men's volleyball players
Place of birth missing (living people)
Volleyball players at the 2015 European Games
European Games competitors for Belgium